Sophie Wilmès  (born 15 January 1975) is a Belgian politician who served as the prime minister of Belgium from 2019 to 2020. She later served as minister of Foreign Affairs from 2020 to 2022. A member of the Reformist Movement, she is the first woman to hold either position.

Wilmès was elected to the Chamber of Representatives in 2014, and served as budget minister in the first and second governments of Charles Michel from 2015 to 2019. In the aftermath of the 2019 Belgian federal election, Philippe of Belgium appointed Wilmès to lead a caretaker government (the Wilmès I Government) before she formed an executive government (the Wilmès II Government) in March 2020 to handle the COVID-19 pandemic. 

In October 2020, she joined the government of Prime Minister Alexander De Croo as foreign minister and deputy prime minister.

Early life 
Wilmès was born in Ixelles, Brussels on 15 January 1975. Her father, Philippe Wilmès, was a banker and economics professor at the Université catholique de Louvain who had been active in liberal politics and had served as chef de cabinet to Jean Gol of the Liberal Reformist Party (Parti Réformateur Libéral, PRL). Her paternal grandparents were killed in the bombing of Limal during World War II. Her mother is of Jewish descent and lost several relatives in the Holocaust and had worked in the office of Mieke Offeciers between 1992 and 1993, during her term as Minister of Budget. Wilmès grew up in the town of Grez-Doiceau, Walloon Brabant.

Wilmès has a degree in applied communication from IHECS and a degree in financial management (Saint-Louis University, Brussels).

For a time, Wilmès worked for the European Commission as a financial officer, and then as an economic and financial adviser in a law firm.

Political career 
In 2000, Wilmès became a councillor in Uccle. From 2007 to 2014, Wilmès was First Alderman in charge of Finance, Budget, Francophone Education, Communication and Local Businesses for the town of Sint-Genesius-Rode. From 2014 to 2015, she was a provincial councillor for the province of Flemish Brabant.

In October 2014, she was elected to the Chamber of Representatives. 

In September 2015, minister of the budget Hervé Jamar announced that he would resign on 1 October 2015, because he was selected as the governor of the province of Liège. Wilmès was selected to succeed him in the Michel I Government. In December 2018, she became Minister of Budget, Civil Service, National Lottery and Scientific Policy in the Michel II Government.

On 27 October 2019, Wilmès became the first female Prime Minister of Belgium, succeeding Charles Michel. She led a caretaker government while negotiations proceeded to form a new coalition government. On 16 March 2020, with negotiations still underway after 15 months, all major parties agreed to grant full legislative powers to the Wilmès government in order to fight the COVID-19 pandemic. Under the terms of the agreement, Wilmès was granted special powers to deal with the pandemic's economic and social impact. These powers were to last for three months, though they could be renewed once for an additional three months. Wilmès was officially nominated as prime minister by King Philippe later on 16 March,  and her reshuffled executive government was sworn in the day after.

On 1 October 2020, Wilmès was appointed deputy prime minister and foreign minister in the new government formed under Alexander De Croo, becoming the first female foreign minister in Belgian history. For a time beginning on 22 October 2020, she managed the country's foreign relations from her intensive care hospital bed as she suffered from COVID-19. It was noted by Deutsche Welle that "Wilmes tested positive for coronavirus" prior to 17 October "after attending an EU summit with her counterparts" at the Europa building in Luxembourg on 12 October, and 13 October. Her Austrian counterpart, Alexander Schallenberg, has also since had a positive test.

On 21 April 2022, Wilmès announced that she would temporarily take a leave of absence and hand over her government responsibilities to spend more time with her family as her husband has been diagnosed with an aggressive brain tumour. Wilmès’s responsibilities were being shared out between, the Prime Minister Alexander De Croo (foreign affairs), David Clarinval (foreign trade) and Mathieu Michel (federal cultural entities). On July 14, 2022, Wilmès resigned definitively as a member of the De Croo government, but she remained a member of parliament.

Personal life
In 2002, Wilmès married Chris Stone, an Australian businessman and former footballer. They have three daughters: Victoria, Charlotte, and Elizabeth. Stone has a son, Jonathan, from a previous relationship.

Shortly after the end of her term as Prime Minister, on 17 October 2020, she tweeted that she was COVID-19-positive. On 22 October, she was admitted to intensive care in stable condition. She was released from hospital on 30 October.

In July 2022, Wilmès announced that she was stepping down from the government to care for her husband, who had been diagnosed with brain cancer.

References

External links

|-

|-

|-

1975 births
Living people
20th-century Belgian politicians
20th-century Belgian women politicians
21st-century Belgian politicians
21st-century Belgian women politicians
Belgian Jews
Female foreign ministers
Foreign ministers of Belgium
Government ministers of Belgium
Jewish Belgian politicians
Jewish prime ministers
Reformist Movement politicians
People from Ixelles
Prime Ministers of Belgium
Women government ministers of Belgium
Women prime ministers